The  is an electric multiple unit (EMU) commuter train type formerly operating on the Tōyō Rapid Railway Line, an extension of the Tokyo Metro Tozai Line in Tokyo, Japan. A total of twelve ten-car sets were converted in 1995 from former TRTA 5000 series sets. They were  retired from service in December 2006, replaced by the Tōyō Rapid 2000 series.

The last three sets to be withdrawn (1061, 1081, 1091) were shipped to Indonesia in 2006 and 2007, where they are operated by KRL Jabodetabek on suburban services in the Jakarta area.

Operations

Until December 2006
 Tōyō Rapid Line
 Tokyo Metro Tōzai Line

Until 2019
 Kereta Commuter Indonesia

Formations
The ten-car sets operated by Toyo Rapid Railway were formed of eight motored ("M") cars and two non-powered trailer ("T") cars as shown below, with the "CT1" car at the eastern end.

 "xx" in the car numbers corresponded to the individual unit number (01 to 10).
 The M1 cars each had one lozenge-type pantograph.

Former identities

The original TRTA set numbers were as shown below.

 Sets 11 and 12 were not used in service, and were subsequently used as sources of spares before being scrapped.

Overseas operations
Three ten-car sets (1061, 1081, and 1091) were shipped to Indonesia from 2006 for use on suburban services operated by Kereta Commuter Indonesia (previously called "KA Commuter Jabodetabek" or "KRL Jabotabek") in Jakarta from January 2007. The sets were initially reduced to eight-car formations, but former set 1061 was withdrawn in December 2015, and set 1091 was split to donate a pair of intermediate cars to lengthen set 1081 to ten cars and also to former Tokyo Metro 5000 series set 5817 to lengthen that set to ten cars also.

Since 2019, with the increasing number of the newer JR East 205 series EMU, set 1081 have been retired from service.

References

Electric multiple units of Japan
Train-related introductions in 1995
Electric multiple units of Indonesia
1500 V DC multiple units of Japan
Tokyu Car multiple units
Kawasaki multiple units
Nippon Sharyo multiple units
Kinki Sharyo multiple units
Kisha Seizo multiple units
Teikoku Sharyo rolling stock